Kahrs can refer to:

 Christian Meidell Kahrs (1858–1924), businessman
 Sophus Kahrs (1918–1986) Norwegian Waffen SS officer
 Johannes Kahrs (artist) (born 1965), artist
 Johannes Kahrs (politician) (born 1963), politician
 Till Kahrs, singer and writer

See also

 Kahr